Jagdfliegerführer Ungarn was formed July 1944 in Budapest, subordinated to I. Jagdkorps.  The headquarters was located at Wien-Kobenzl.  The unit was disbanded on January 7, 1945.

Commanding officers

Fliegerführer
Major Gerhard Schöpfel, August 1944 - January 1945

References
Notes

References
 Jagdfliegerführer Ungarn @ Lexikon der Wehrmacht
 Jagdfliegerführer Ungarn @ The Luftwaffe, 1933-45

Luftwaffe Fliegerführer
Military units and formations established in 1944
Military units and formations disestablished in 1945